Leopold Siegfried Rother Cuhn (27 August 1894 – 3 July 1978) was a German-Colombian architect, urban planner and educator. He developed important projects particularly in Colombia. The most known project was the design of the Campus of the Universidad Nacional de Colombia in Bogotá.

External links 
  Luis Angel Arango Library Website - Biography

20th-century German architects
Naturalized citizens of Colombia
1978 deaths
1894 births
German emigrants to Colombia